Słupice may refer to the following places in Poland:
Słupice, Lower Silesian Voivodeship (south-west Poland)
Słupice, Opole Voivodeship (south-west Poland)